Professor Green (born 1983) is a British singer and songwriter.

Professor Green may also refer to:

Ben Green (mathematician) (born 1977), British mathematician
David W. Green (psychologist), British psychologist
James N. Green, professor and historian
Judith Green (historian) (born 1947), English medieval historian
Lucy Green (born 1957), British academic
Martin Green (professor) (born 1948), Australian engineer and professor
Michael Green (physicist) (born 1946), British physicist
Peter Green (statistician) (born 1950), British statistician
William H. Green (born 1963), American chemical engineer